Daniel Vaillant (born 19 July 1949) is a French Socialist politician.

Biography
Close to Lionel Jospin, Vaillant held several ministerial portfolios in his cabinets: Minister of the Relations with Parliament from 1997 to 2000 and Interior Minister from 2000 to 2002. He also supported Jospin as candidate for the Socialist Party in the 2007 presidential election; a candidacy which eventually did not materialize.

As of 2009, he is mayor of the 18th arrondissement of Paris (first election 1995) and a member of the National Assembly.

In October 2009, he proposed to decriminalize the personal use of cannabis through control of production and import, as is the case with alcohol.

Published work

 C'est à ma gauche, Éditions Plon, 2003 (with a foreword by Lionel Jospin « La Sécurité, priorité à gauche »)
 PS : 40 ans d'histoire(s). Du congrès d'Épinay à nos jours, Éditions L'Archipel, 2011, 414 p.

References

External links
 Official biography on the French Parliament website.

1949 births
Living people
People from Nièvre
Politicians from Paris
Socialist Party (France) politicians
French interior ministers
Mayors of arrondissements of Paris
Deputies of the 12th National Assembly of the French Fifth Republic
Deputies of the 13th National Assembly of the French Fifth Republic
Deputies of the 14th National Assembly of the French Fifth Republic
Chevaliers of the Légion d'honneur
Candidates for the 2017 French legislative election